Jutta Höhne (born Popken on 26 March 1951) is a retired German fencer. She competed in the team foil event at the 1976 Summer Olympics and finished in fourth place. Her foil team won the bronze medal at the 1979 World Fencing Championships.

References

1951 births
Living people
German female fencers
Olympic fencers of West Germany
Fencers at the 1976 Summer Olympics
Sportspeople from Gelsenkirchen